Gim Su-cheol, also known as Kim Su-cheol, was a painter of the late Joseon period. His birth date are not known. Gim Su-cheol was good at landscape painting and muninhwa.

See also
Korean painting
List of Korean painters
Korean art
Korean culture

References

External links
Brief biography and gallery (in Korean)

Joseon painters
Gimhae Kim clan
Year of death unknown
Year of birth unknown